Brayon Blake (born December 8, 1995) is an American professional basketball player who last played for Gießen 46ers of the Basketball Bundesliga. He played college basketball at Cochise College, North Idaho College and Idaho.

College career
Blake began his collegiate career at Cochise College, where he led the team with 16.4 points and 10.3 rebounds per game, before transferring to North Idaho College before his sophomore year. At North Idaho, Blake averaged 21.2 points and 6.6 rebounds per game and was named to the Third Team NJCAA All-America. He committed to play at the University of Idaho for the final two seasons of his eligibility.

In his first season with the Vandals, Blake led the team with 6.1 rebounds per game and finished second with 10.0 points per game over 32 games (10 starts). As a senior, he was named first team All-Big Sky Conference after averaging 17.0 points and a conference-leading 9.6 rebounds per game.

Professional career
Blake signed with Basketball Löwen Braunschweig of the German Basketball Bundesliga on July 19, 2018. In his first professional season, Blake averaged 9.1 points, 4 rebounds and 1 assist over 37 BBL games.

Blake signed with Peristeri B.C. of the Greek Basket League on July 18, 2019.

On February 27, 2020, he has signed with Manisa Büyükşehir Belediye of the Turkish Basketball First League.

On August 9, 2020, he has signed with Sigortam.net of the Turkish Basketball First League.

On July 1, 2021, he has signed with Gießen 46ers of the Basketball Bundesliga.

References

External links
Idaho Vandals bio
RealGM profile
EuroBasket profile

1995 births
Living people
American expatriate basketball people in Germany
American expatriate basketball people in Greece
American men's basketball players
Basketball Löwen Braunschweig players
Basketball players from Seattle
Cochise Apaches men's basketball players
Giessen 46ers players
North Idaho Cardinals men's basketball players
Idaho Vandals men's basketball players
Peristeri B.C. players